Banded moray is a common name for several fishes and may refer to:

Channomuraena vittata
Echidna polyzona
Gymnothorax rueppelliae

See also
 Myrichthys colubrinus, banded snake eel
 Gymnomuraena zebra, zebra moray